Justin Tyler Bamberg (born March 7, 1987) is an American attorney and politician serving as a member of the South Carolina House of Representatives from the 90th district, which includes Bamberg County and parts of Barnwell and Colleton Counties.

Early life and education
Bamberg was born in Bamberg, South Carolina March 7, 1987. He earned a Bachelor of Arts degree from the University of South Carolina and a Juris Doctor from the University of South Carolina School of Law in 2011.

Career

Bamberg serves as a Democratic member of the South Carolina House of Representatives and worked as a personal injury trial lawyer with Bamberg Legal, LLC.

In 2015, he represented the family of police-shooting victim Walter Scott. In October 2015, Bamberg, an attorney with the law firm of Bamberg Legal in Bamberg, South Carolina, along with attorney L. Chris Stewart of Stewart Seay & Felton in Atlanta, Georgia, negotiated a $6.5 million pre-suit settlement on behalf of the Estate of Walter Scott to resolve claims for wrongful death and civil rights violations. It was the largest pre-suit settlement of its kind in South Carolina history. The former officer, Michael Slager, pled guilty to federal civil rights violations and sentenced to 20 years for the murder of Walter Scott.

In late 2015, Bamberg initially supported and formally endorsed Hillary Clinton for president. In January 2016, Bamberg pulled his endorsement and formally endorsed Vermont Senator Bernie Sanders, highlighting Sanders' unwavering support of "racial, social and economic justice". Bamberg went on to undertake a role as one of Sanders' National Surrogates, appearing with Sanders at events across the country as well as on his behalf. On November 9, 2017, Our Revolution—a national, grassroots organization which spawned into existence in the wake of Senator Sanders historic Presidential run—announced that Bamberg had been elected to its national board of directors.

Bamberg has served as attorney for clients in some of the United States' most high-profile cases, particularly in regards to officer-involved incidents. In addition to the Walter Scott case, Bamberg has represented the families of Alton Sterling in Baton Rouge, Louisiana; Bryant Heyward in Hollywood, South Carolina; and Keith Scott in Charlotte, North Carolina. Bamberg represented the family of 20-year old Kouren-Rodney Bernard Thomas of Raleigh, North Carolina, who was shot and killed by a neighbor when leaving a house party in August 2016 – a shooting that drew comparisons to Trayvon Martin's death in Florida, and "Jane Doe," an Orangeburg County, South Carolina woman who was allegedly coerced into performing a sex act by an on-duty deputy sheriff. In 2017, Bamberg resolved the civil case against the Orangeburg County Sheriff's Office pre-suit for $350,000, stating at the time: "Most officers and the departments in which they serve are amazing, and we should be grateful that they have dedicated their lives to serving and protecting us all; however, we must continue to fight against any abuse of power. And we will play an important role in addressing that issue."

Bamberg again found himself in the civil rights spotlight when an officer with the Town of Kingstree tasered an unarmed, 86-year-old man after a traffic stop in rural, South Carolina. The police department reported that the elderly man had failed to stop for blue lights and on exiting his vehicle, was tasered by the officers "for his own safety." In less than one month, Bamberg had negotiated a $900,000 legal settlement on behalf of the grandfather for civil rights violations, representing one of the quickest and most substantial pre-suit legal settlements in an officer involved taser case in the history of South Carolina. During the same time period, Bamberg undertook representing the mother of Del'Quan Seagers, a minor who died in 2015 while in the custody of the South Carolina Department of Juvenile Justice and residing at a wilderness camp operated by AMIKids, Inc., a national non-profit organization operating juvenile wilderness camps and alternative school across the United States. On January 27, 2017, the South Carolina Department of Juvenile Justice and the wilderness camps operated by AMIKids came under tremendous scrutiny after a thorough review and scathing report was issued by the South Carolina Legislative Audit Council, which found numerous failures by the department and company in the operations of the camps for detained juveniles. A day after the report was released, then SCDJJ Director Sylvia Murray resigned. Bamberg's representation helped prompt national discussions on alternative placement facilities for juveniles in the United States.

In addition to his civil rights trial work, Bamberg has successfully represented individuals in personal injury and wrongful death matters, such as the fatal tractor trailer accident that claimed the life of a Bamberg City Councilwoman in 2015, and a Duke University Hospital employee who was sexually assaulted by an unknown assailant while on the job.

In January 2017, news arose that Kamiyah Mobley, who was abducted from a Jacksonville, Florida hospital in 1998 at eight hours old, had been found in Walterboro, South Carolina, having been raised by her abductor under the name Alexis Manigo. Then eighteen, Mobley retained attorney Bamberg to represent her interests, such as working to obtain identification and a Social Security card.

Bamberg was noted in August 2017 to have been "exploring" a possible run for governor in the State of South Carolina, the same stirring conversation on the possibility of the state having its first Democratic governor in over a decade.

In April 2019, Bamberg endorsed Bernie Sanders in the 2020 Democratic Party presidential primaries.

On December 16, 2021, Bamberg announced he was representing Johnny Bush, an alleged victim of Alex Murdaugh. Murdaugh is alleged to have stolen $95,000 of Bush's settlement money.

References

External links

1987 births
Living people
African-American state legislators in South Carolina
Democratic Party members of the South Carolina House of Representatives
University of South Carolina School of Law alumni
21st-century American politicians
South Carolina lawyers
21st-century American lawyers
African-American lawyers
People from Bamberg, South Carolina
21st-century African-American politicians
20th-century African-American people